Hilarographa ludens is a species of moth of the family Tortricidae. It is found on Buru of Indonesia.

References

Moths described in 1948
Hilarographini